Laurent Duvernay-Tardif  (born February 11, 1991) is a Canadian football guard for the New York Jets of the National Football League (NFL). He played university football and attended medical school at McGill University in Montreal, Canada, before being drafted by the Kansas City Chiefs in the sixth round of the 2014 NFL Draft. Duvernay-Tardif is only the fourth medical school graduate to play in the NFL. He was made a Knight of the National Order of Quebec in 2019 and enrolled at Harvard University to get a Master of Public Health degree the following year.

Duvernay-Tardif opted out of the 2020 NFL season due to concerns over the COVID-19 pandemic and returned to Canada to work in a care facility. As a result of his efforts on and off the field in 2020, he was named a co-winner of the Lou Marsh Award, given annually to Canada's top athlete, as well as the Sports Illustrated Sportsperson of the Year. He returned to the NFL in 2021 after being traded to the New York Jets.

Early life
Duvernay-Tardif was born in Mont-Saint-Hilaire, Quebec, and grew up in Montreal. He started playing football at the age of 14, until his family went on a year long sailing trip to the Bahamas. After their return, he resumed playing football at age 16 for his high school. His native language is French.

University career
Duvernay-Tardif attended McGill University, where he was member of the McGill Men's football team from 2010 to 2013. In his final year, he won the J. P. Metras Trophy, recognizing the best lineman in the Canadian Interuniversity Sport (now U Sports) system, and was named an All-Canadian for the second consecutive season.

He balanced university football with medical school. In a 2014 article in Sports Illustrated, Joan Niesen said that he "was practicing just once a week—and he was still the best college player in Canada."

Professional career
Duvernay-Tardif played in the 2014 East-West Shrine Game, in which he was part of Jerry Glanville's East team that defeated the West 23–13. Duvernay-Tardif did not receive an invitation to the NFL Scouting Combine. On March 27, 2014, Duvernay-Tardif held a personal pro day in Montreal that was attended by nine NFL teams and four Canadian Football League (CFL) teams.

CFL Draft
In the CFL's Amateur Scouting Bureau final rankings, Duvernay-Tardif was ranked as the best eligible player for the 2014 CFL Draft, a position he held throughout the entirety of the season. However, due to the uncertainty as to his availability as a result of his selection in the NFL Draft, he fell in the draft. He was drafted by the Calgary Stampeders in the third round (19th overall).

Kansas City Chiefs

2014
The Kansas City Chiefs selected Duvernay-Tardif in the sixth round (200th overall) of the 2014 NFL Draft. Duvernay-Tardif was the 15th offensive tackle drafted in 2014. Since the inception of the NFL Draft, Duvernay-Tardif is the tenth player to be chosen from a Canadian university.

On May 14, 2014, the Kansas City Chiefs signed Duvernay-Tardif to a four-year, $2.34 million contract that includes a signing bonus of $100,300.

Throughout training camp, Duvernay-Tardif competed to be a starting guard against Zach Fulton, Jeffrey Linkenbach, Rishaw Johnson, Mike McGlynn, and Rokevious Watkins. Head coach Andy Reid named Duvernay-Tardif the fifth offensive guard on the depth chart to start the regular season, behind Jeff Allen, Zach Fulton, Jeff Linkenbach, and Mike McGlynn.

2015
On September 13, 2015, Duvernay-Tardif made his first career start for the Chiefs in the season opener against the Houston Texans. He went on to play all 16 games with 13 starts for the Chiefs in 2015.

2016
In the 2016 season, Duvernay-Tardif started all 14 games he played in at right guard for the Chiefs.

2017
On February 28, 2017, the Kansas City Chiefs signed Duvernay-Tardif to a five-year, $42.36 million contract that includes $20.20 million guaranteed and a signing bonus of $10 million.

2018
Duvernay-Tardif started the first five games of the 2018 season at right guard before suffering a fractured fibula in Week 5. He was placed on injured reserve on October 9. Chiefs head coach Andy Reid said he will not be out for the season and will be reactivated at some point later in the season. However, his injury was worse than originally thought, and he didn't start practicing again until the last week of the schedule. He was activated off injured reserve on January 15, 2019, prior to the Chiefs AFC Championship matchup against the New England Patriots.

2019
In 2019, Duvernay-Tardif played 14 games. On February 2, 2020, the Chiefs went on to win Super Bowl LIV, their first championship in 50 years.

2020
On April 22, 2020, the Chiefs restructured Duvernay-Tardif's contract to free up salary cap space.

On July 24, he announced via his Twitter account he chose to opt-out of playing during the 2020 season as a precaution due to COVID-19. Duvernay-Tardif had been working as an orderly at a Montreal long-term care facility during the pandemic. He was the first NFL player to announce he would not play the season because of COVID-19. His role in fighting COVID off the field in 2020 resulted in Sports Illustrated naming Duvernay-Tardif one of their Sportspeople of the Year. For his efforts both on and off the field in 2020, he was named a co-winner of the Lou Marsh Trophy, which is awarded annually to Canada's top athlete for the year.

2021 
On July 10, 2021, Duvernay-Tardif was named the recipient of the Muhammad Ali Sports Humanitarian Award at the 2021 ESPYs for his decision to opt out of the 2020 NFL season to help fight the global COVID-19 pandemic.

New York Jets 
Duvernay-Tardif was traded to the New York Jets on November 2, 2021, in exchange for tight end Daniel Brown.

On November 18, 2022, after going unsigned all offseason and into the season, Duvernay-Tardif was signed to the Jets practice squad. He was promoted to the active roster on December 7.

Personal life
Duvernay-Tardif is the fourth NFL player to have graduated from medical school, and as of the 2018 season, the only active player. He graduated from McGill University Faculty of Medicine in May 2018 with a Doctor of Medicine and Master of Surgery (M.D., C.M.). He primarily studied during the off-season prior to mandatory off-season workouts. He had the support of the Chiefs coaching staff, especially head coach Andy Reid, whose mother also graduated from McGill's medical school. Following his graduation, he petitioned the NFL to add the title "M.D." on the back of his jersey. The league denied his request, prompting fans and writers to criticize the league's decision. He has not yet completed his postgraduate medical training. Duvernay-Tardif provided the convocation address at McGill's 2020 graduation ceremony. In 2020, he also started studying at Harvard University to get a Master of Public Health.

During the 2018 offseason, Duvernay-Tardif worked as a feature reporter for the Canadian Broadcasting Corporation (CBC) during its coverage of the 2018 Winter Olympics. He is also a member of the NFLPA Health and Safety Committee to protect the health of players. 

In 2019, Duvernay-Tardif was made a Knight of the National Order of Quebec. He is the grandson of former Quebec cabinet minister Guy Tardif.

During the COVID-19 pandemic, Duvernay-Tardif wanted to help combat the pandemic and returned to Quebec to work at CHSLD Gertrude-Lafrance, a long-term care facility in Saint-Jean-sur-Richelieu. He was profiled in a TSN documentary, "Front Line", which was later nominated for the best sports feature segment at the 9th Canadian Screen Awards.

See also
 Mark Adickes - former NFL player who became an orthopedic surgeon; ESPN NFL Injury Analyst
 Tommy Casanova – former NFL player who became an ophthalmologist
 Dan Doornink – former NFL running back who became a medical doctor
 John Frank – Super Bowl winning SF 49er who became a NY City based plastic surgeon
 Bill McColl – former NFL player who became an orthopedic surgeon, father of Milt McColl
 Milt McColl – former NFL linebacker who became a medical doctor
 Myron Rolle – former NFL defensive back who was also a Rhodes scholar and is a current neurosurgery resident
 Doug Swift – former NFL linebacker who became an anesthesiologist   
 Rob Zatechka – former NFL guard who became a medical doctor
 Stefan Humphries – former NFL guard who became an orthopedic surgeon

Footnotes

References

External links
McGill Redmen biography
YouTube video: 'The First Active NFL Player to Become a Doctor: Blocking for Mahomes & Saving Lives'

1991 births
Living people
American football offensive guards
American football offensive tackles
Canadian expatriate American football people in the United States
Canadian football offensive linemen
Canadian players of American football
French Quebecers
Gridiron football people from Quebec
Kansas City Chiefs players
Lou Marsh Trophy winners
McGill Redbirds football players
McGill University Faculty of Medicine alumni
New York Jets players
People from Montérégie
Players of Canadian football from Quebec
Sportspeople from Montreal